NTPC Auraiya is located at Dibiyapur in Auraiya district in the Indian state of Uttar Pradesh. The power plant is one of the gas-based power plants of NTPC. The gas for the power plant is sourced from GAIL HBJ Pipeline – South Basin Gas field. Source of water for the power plant is 	Auraiya – Etawah Canal.

Capacity

References

 NTPC Auraiya

Natural gas-fired power stations in Uttar Pradesh
Dibiyapur
1989 establishments in Uttar Pradesh
Energy infrastructure completed in 1989